Daripalli Ramaiah known as Chetla (trees) Ramaiah also Vanajeevi (forest being) Ramaiah (born 1937) is an Indian social worker known for his social forestry initiatives. He is the recipient of the Padma Shri award for the year 2017, for his invaluable contribution to extending tree cover. He is locally known as 'Chetla Ramaiah', trees Ramaiah. On a mission to bring back the green cover, he is estimated to have planted more than 100 thousand saplings in and around Khammam district with a thrust on trees that provide shade, fruit-bearing plants, and Biodiesel plants with assured benefit to future generations.

Early life
He was born in Reddypally village in Khammam district, Hyderabad State (now in Telangana). He had schooling till 10th standard.

Life

Social forestry campaign
As a relentless campaigner of social forestry for more than 5 decades, Ramaiah himself cannot recall when it all exactly started. He remembers vaguely that as a child he often saw his mother saving the seeds of vegetable plants for the next Growing season. Ever since he was a child, he has been collecting seeds of native trees such as Sandalwood, Albizia saman, Ficus religiosa, Aegle marmelos, Neolamarckia cadamba and many more in his mission to cover every barren land with trees.

Ramaiah believes in seed as the solution to human well being. "Of all the species that consider the Earth as their home, the most exalted is the human being. He supposedly has intellect, can think, can do and can get things done. Nature has bestowed her choicest blessings on this form of life. Therefore, we have a duty towards nature. Protect the nature; protect everything created by God, for the posterity", says Daripalli Ramaiah.

He sold his 3 acres land to buy more saplings and seeds.

Biography Book

Vitthanam nundi Padmam Varaku-Vanajeevi Prayaanam by Naresh Jilla in Telugu

These book describes Ramaiah's life from Childhood to Padma Sri and Ramaiah's Succession Principles.

Modus Operandi

Ramaiah transformed the famous quote "Plant a tree and save a life" into action rather than lecturing the benefits.  Locals know him as a man with pockets full of seeds and who pedals miles together with an overload of saplings on his bicycle. He truly recognises the need to plant trees to save our environment and desperately plants saplings in each and every barren land he passes by. Sometimes he is accompanied by his wife and children from local schools. Though he never had any formal education, Ramaiah in his pursuit has read up umpteen number of books on trees and the process of planting trees. He is considered as a walking encyclopedia on plants.

Recognition and awards

The government of Andhra Pradesh gave him special recognition for his relentless drive and contribution towards the country. After the formation of Telangana, he continued to receive support from the Chief Minister Kalvakuntla Chandrashekar Rao's flagship programmes such as Telangana Ku Haritha Hāram (Green Garland). The objective of Haritha Hāram scheme is to increase the green cover from present 24% to 33% of the total geographical area of the state.

References 

1937 births
People from Khammam district
Recipients of the Padma Shri in social work
Living people
Social workers from Telangana
Social workers
Indian environmentalists
20th-century Indian educational theorists